is a contemporary Japanese writer.

Works 
 Amerika no Yoru (アメリカの夜 American Night). 1994. Kodansha.  (likely reference to film technique “day for night”, known in French as “la nuit américaine”) Day for Night (film)
 ABC Sensou (ABC戦争 The ABC Wars). 1995. Kodansha. 
 Indivijuaru Purojekushon (インディヴィジュアル・プロジェクション Individual Projection). 1997. Shinchousha. 
 Koushakufujin-tei no Gogo no Paatii (公爵婦人邸の午後のパーティー The Evening Party at the Princess's House). 1997. Kodansha.
 Mujou no Sekai (無情の世界 This Cruel World). 1999. Kodansha. 
 Nipponia Nippon (ニッポニアニッポン Nipponia Nippon). 2001. Shinchousha. 
 Shinsemia (シンセミア Sinsemilla). 2003. Asahi Shinbun-sha. 
 Gurando Finare (グランド・フィナーレ Grand Finale). 2005. Kodansha. 
 Purasutikku Souru (プラスティック・ソウル Plastic Soul). 2006. Kodansha. 
 Misuteriasu Settingu (ミステリアス・セッティング Mysterious Soul). 2006. Asahi Shinbun-sha. 
 Pisutoruzu (ピストルズ Pistols). 2010. Kodansha. 
 Kuesa to Jusanbanme no Hashira (クエーサーと13番目の柱). 2012. Kodansha. 
 Shikaku (□ しかく). 2013. Little More. 
 Derakkusu Edhisyon (Deluxe Edition). 2013. Bungeishunju. 
 Kyaputen Sandaboruto (キャプテンサンダーボルト Captain Thunderbolt). with Kotaro Isaka. 2014. Bungeishunju. 
 Oganizumu (オーガニズム Orga（ni）sm). 2019. Bungeishunju. 
 Brakku Chenba Myujikku (ブラック・チェンバー・ミュージック Black Chamber Music). 2021. Mainichi Shimbun Publishing. 
 Arutimetto Edhisyon (Ultimate Edition). 2022. Kawade Shobo Shinsha.

Awards 
 1994 – 37th Gunzo Prize for New Writers: Amerika no Yoru
 1999 – 21st Noma Literary New Face Prize: Mujo no sekai
 2004 – 15th Sei Ito Literature Prize: Shinsemia
 2004 – 58th Mainichi Publishing Culture Award: Shinsemia
 2005 – 132nd Akutagawa Prize: Gurando Finare
 2010 – 46th Tanizaki Prize: Pisutoruzu

See also 
Japanese literature
List of Japanese authors

External links 
Synopsis of Sinsemillas (Shinsemia) at JLPP (Japanese Literature Publishing Project) 
http://no-sword.jp/blog/2005/02/grand-finale-by-abe-kazushige.html 

Japanese writers
1968 births
Living people
People from Higashine, Yamagata
Writers from Yamagata Prefecture
Akutagawa Prize winners